The Electric Sun Years Vol I & II is a DVD by Uli Jon Roth. It was released in 2002 and features archive footage of the early years of his band Electric Sun.

Track listing
Electric Sun era I
Amsterdam 1979/1980
 Lilac 1:34
 Electric Sun 5:12
 Sundown 4:06
 Earthquake (Part II) 6:07
 Japanese Dream 3:22
Mulhouse 1982
 Fire Wind 5:37
 Virgin Killer 3:56
 Free Jam Encore (improvised) 4:35
 Mutron Jam (improvised) 2:07
 Red House Blues 4:03
Electric Sun Era II
Sweden & UK May 1983
 Icebreaker 4:02
 What Is Love? 3:12
 Why? 6:02
 Enola Gay - Hiroshima Today? 11:22
 Angel of Peace 3:34
 Return 3:13
 Cast Away Your Chains 3:29
 Virgin Killer (II) 2:00
 Drum & Percussion Solo (Clive Bunker-Simon Fox) 7:20
 Electric Sun 4:23
 Polar Nights 12:01
 Beethoven Paraphrase 7:10
 Hell Cat 2:50
 Dark Lady 7:36
 Midnight Sun (Newcastle Jam) 8:46

Special Features:
The Documentary and Rehearsal -Tour Impressions- (28:03)
Interview in Tokyo 2001 (19:27)
Photographs
The Website Information

Musicians
Uli Jon Roth: Guitar, vocals
Ule Ritgen: Bass, Backing Vocals
Sidhatta Gautama: drums (1979-1982)
Clive Bunker: Drums (1983)
Simon Fox: Drums, percussion (1983)
David Lennox: keyboards (1983)
Jenni Evans: Vocals (1983)
Dorothy Patterson: Vocals (1983)

Uli Jon Roth video albums
2002 compilation albums
2002 video albums
2002 live albums
Live video albums